Phong Thạnh Tây B is a rural commune (xã) and village in Phước Long District, Bạc Liêu Province, in south-western Vietnam.

References

Populated places in Bạc Liêu province
Communes of Bạc Liêu province